This page is a historic list of units in the United Kingdom Territorial Army as of 2012, prior to its disestablishment, and re-establishment as the Army Reserve, in 2014.

Honourable Artillery Company
 Honourable Artillery Company in Finsbury

Royal Armoured Corps
 The Royal Yeomanry (Armoured Reconnaissance Role)
 Regimental Headquarters, London
 A (Royal Wiltshire Yeomanry) Squadron, Swindon
 B (Leicestershire & Derbyshire Yeomanry) Squadron, Leicester
 C (Kent & Sharpshooters Yeomanry) Squadron, Croydon
 S (Sherwood Rangers Yeomanry) Squadron, Carlton
 W (Westminster Dragoons) Squadron, Westminster
 The Queen's Own Yeomanry (Armoured Reconnaissance Role)
 Regimental Headquarters, Newcastle upon Tyne
 A (The Earl of Carrick's Own Ayrshire Yeomanry) Squadron, Ayr
 B (North Irish Horse) Squadron, Belfast
 C (Fife and Forfar Yeomanry/Scottish Horse) Squadron, Cupar
 D (Northumberland Hussars Yeomanry) Squadron, Newcastle upon Tyne
 Y (Queen's Own Yorkshire Yeomanry) Squadron, York
 The Royal Mercian and Lancastrian Yeomanry (Tank replacement role)
 Regimental Headquarters, Dudley
 A (Staffordshire, Warwickshire and Worcestershire Yeomanry) Squadron, Dudley
 B (Shropshire Yeomanry) Squadron, Telford
 C (The Earl of Chester's Own Cheshire Yeomanry) Squadron, Chester
 D (The Duke of Lancaster's Own Yeomanry) Squadron, Wigan
 Manoeuvre and Support Squadron, Hereford
 The Royal Wessex Yeomanry (Tank replacement role)
 Regimental Headquarters, Bovington
 A (The Queen's Own Dorset Yeomanry) Squadron, Bovington
 C (Royal Gloucestershire Hussars Yeomanry) Squadron, Cirencester
 D (Royal Devon Yeomanry) Squadron, Barnstaple/Paignton

Royal Artillery
 100 (Yeomanry) Regiment, Royal Artillery - Light artillery
 Regimental Headquarters
 201 (Hertfordshire and Bedfordshire Yeomanry) Parachute Battery, Leagrave
 266 (Gloucestershire Volunteer Artillery) Battery, Clifton
 307 (South Nottinghamshire Hussars Yeomanry, Royal Horse Artillery) Battery, Nottingham
 101 (Northumbrian) Regiment Royal Artillery - Artillery reconnaissance and MLRS
 Regimental Headquarters
 203 (Elswick) Battery Royal, Blyth
 204 (Tyneside Scottish) Battery, Kingston Park
 205 (3rd Durham Volunteer Artillery) Battery, South Shields
 269 (West Riding) Battery, Leeds
 103 (Lancastrian Artillery Volunteers) Regiment, Royal Artillery - Air defence
 Regimental Headquarters including Lancashire Artillery Volunteer Band & Pipes and Drums of the Lancashire Volunteer Artillery
 208 (3rd West Lancashire) Battery, Liverpool
 209 (The Manchester and Saint Helens Artillery) Battery, Manchester/St Helens
 216 (The Bolton Artillery) Battery, Bolton
 104 Regiment, Royal Artillery - MUAS
 Regimental Headquarters, Newport
 211 (South Wales) Battery, Cardiff/Abertillery
 214 (Worcestershire) Battery, Worcester
 217 (City of Newport) Battery, Newport
 105 Regiment, Royal Artillery - Light artillery
 Regimental Headquarters
 206 (Ulster) Battery, Newtownards/Coleraine
 207 (City of Glasgow) Battery, Glasgow/Edinburgh
 212 (Highland) Battery, Arbroath/Kirkcaldy/Lerwick
 106 (Yeomanry) Regiment, Royal Artillery - Air defence
 Regimental Headquarters
 210 (Staffordshire) Battery, Wolverhampton
 265 (Home Counties) Battery, Grove Park
 457 (Hampshire Carabiniers Yeomanry) Battery, Southampton

Royal Engineers
 Engineer and Logistic Staff Corps (roughly battalion sized)
 Royal Monmouthshire Royal Engineers (Militia), although termed militia, the regiment did not differ from its TA counterparts
 Regimental Headquarters, Monmouth Castle
 Headquarters Troop, Vauxhall Camp
 100 Field Squadron, Cwmbran/Llandaff/Cardiff/Bristol
 108 (Welsh) Field Squadron, Swansea/Gorseinon
 225 (City of Birmingham) Field Squadron, Oldbury/Walsall
 Jersey Field Squadron (The Royal Militia Island of Jersey), Saint Helier
 71 Engineer Regiment
 Regimental Headquarters & Headquarters Troop, RAF Leuchars
 102 (Clyde) Field Squadron (Air Support), Paisley
 124 (Lowland) Field Squadron (Air Support), Cumbernauld
 236 Field Squadron (Air Support), Elgin/Kirkwall
 11 Combat Support Troop, RAF Leuchars
 72 (Tyne Electrical Engineers) Engineer Regiment
 Regimental Headquarters & Headquarters Troop, Gateshead
 103 (1st Newcastle) Field Squadron, Heaton
 106 (West Riding) Field Squadron, Greenhill
 73 Engineer Regiment
 Regimental Headquarters & Headquarters Troops, Nottingham
 350 (Nottinghamshire) Field Squadron, Chilwell
 575 (Sherwood Foresters) Field Squadron, Chesterfield/Derby
 75 Engineer Regiment
 Regimental Headquarters & Headquarters Troop, Warrington
 107 (Lancashire & Cheshire) Field Squadron, Birkenhead/Widnes
 125 (Staffordshire) Field Squadron, Stoke-on-Trent/Cannock
 202 (Duke of Lancaster's) Training Squadron, Manchester
 101 (City of London) Engineer Regiment (Explosive Ordnance Disposal) This Regiment comprised both Regular and TA sub units, TA sub units were:
 Regimental Headquarters, Ilford
 221 Field Squadron (EOD), Catford/Rochester
 579 Field Squadron (EOD), Royal Tunbridge Wells/Reigate/Brighton
 65 Works Group, Chilwell [Only showing TA units]
 508 (Works) Specialist Team
 509 (Port Infrastructure & Works) Specialist Team
 525 (Works) Specialist Team
 556 (Works) Specialist Team
 503 (Fuels Infrastructure) Specialist Team (Support regular 74 Works Group)
 504 (Power Infrastructure) Specialist Team (Supports regular 63 Works Group)
 506 (Water Infrastructure) Specialist Team (Supports regular 62 Works Group)
 510 (Air Infrastructure) Specialist Team (Supports 66 Works Group)
 131 Independent Commando Squadron, Kingsbury, London (Supports regular 24 Commando Engineer Regiment)
 135 Independent Geographic Squadron, Ewell (Supports regular 42 Geographic Engineer Regiment)
 591 (Antrim Artillery) Field Squadron, Royal Engineers, Bangor
 299 Parachute Field Squadron, Wakefield/Kingston upon Hull/Pontefract

Royal Corps of Signals
 32nd (Scottish) Signal Regiment
 Regimental Headquarters & Headquarters Squadron, Glasgow
 Northern Band of the Royal Corps of Signals, Nottingham
 33 (Lancashire and Cheshire) Signal Squadron, Liverpool/Manchester
 40 (Ulster) Signal Squadron, Belfast/Derry
 50 (Northumbrian) Signal Squadron, Darlington/Hartlepool
 51 (Highland) Signal Squadron, East Kilbride/Edinburgh
 52 (Lowland) Support Squadron, Glasgow
 37th Signal Regiment
 Regimental Headquarters & Headquarters Squadron, Redditch
 36 (Eastern) Signal Squadron, Colchester
 48 (City of Birmingham) Signal Squadron, Birmingham
 53 (Welsh) Signal Squadron, Cardiff
 54 (Worcestershire) Support Squadron, Redditch
 854 (East Anglia) Signal Troop, Cambridge
 867 (Queen's Own Warwickshire & Worcestershire) Signal Troop, Stratford-upon-Avon
 896 (Worcestershire and Sherwood Foresters) Signal Troop, Coventry
 38th (City of Sheffield) Signal Regiment
 Regimental Headquarters & Headquarters Squadron, Sheffield
 1 (Royal Buckinghamshire Yeomanry) Signal Squadron, Milton Keynes/Banbury/Rugby
 2 (City of Dundee) Signal Squadron, Dundee/Aberdeen
 41 (Princess Louises's Kensingtons) Signal Squadron, Croydon/Kingston upon Thames
 46 (Hallamshire) Support Signal Squadron, Sheffield
 64 (Sheffield) Signal Squadron, Leeds/Sheffield/Nottingham
 39th (The Skinners) Signal Regiment
 Regimental Headquarters & Headquarters Squadron, Horfield
 56 (Home Counties) Signal Squadron, Brighton/Eastbourne
 57 (City and County of Bristol) Signal Squadron, Bristol/Gloucester
 94 (Berkshire Yeomanry) Signal Squadron, Aylesbury/Windsor
 71st (City of London) Yeomanry Signal Regiment
 Regimental Headquarters & Headquarters Squadron, Bexleyheath
 47 (Middlesex Yeomanry) Signal Squadron, Uxbridge/Southfields
 68 (Inns of Court & City Yeomanry) Signal Squadron, City of London/Whipps Cross/Chelmsford
 265 (Kent and County of London Yeomanry) Support Squadron, Bexleyheath
 43 (Wessex) Signal Squadron (Air Support), Bath (Supports regular 21 Signal Regiment (Air Support))
 63 (SAS) Signals Squadron, Thorney Island
 81 (Merseyside) Signal Squadron, Corsham

Infantry
 Royal Regiment of Scotland
 52nd Lowland Volunteers, 6th Battalion, The Royal Regiment of Scotland
 Battalion Headquarters & Headquarters Squadron, Glasgow (Includes the Lowland Band of the Royal Regiment of Scotland and 6 SCOTS Pipes and Drums)
 A (Royal Scots Borderers) Company, Edinburgh/Bathgate/Galashiels
 B (Royal Highland Fusiliers) Company, Ayr/Dumfries
 C (Royal Highland Fusiliers) Company, Glasgow/Motherwell
 51st Highland Volunteers, 7th Battalion, The Royal Regiment of Scotland
 Battalion Headquarters & Headquarters Squadron, Perth (Includes the Highland Band of the Royal Regiment of Scotland and 7 SCOTS Pipes and Drums)
 A (Black Watch) Company, Dundee/Kirkcaldy
 B (Highlanders) Company, Aberdeen/Peterhead/Keith/Lerwick
 C (Highlanders) Company, Inverness/Wick/Stornoway
 D (Argyll and Sutherland Highlanders) Company, Dumbarton/Dunoon
 The Princess of Wales's Royal Regiment
 3rd (Volunteer) Battalion, The Princess of Wales's Royal Regiment
 Battalion Headquarters & Headquarters Company, Canterbury/Dover (includes the Corps of Drums of the battalion & Regimental Band, also including Training (Tangier) Wing)
 A (Queen's Royal Surreys) Company, Farnham/Camberley
 B (Royal Sussex) Company, Brighton/Worthing
 C (The Buffs) Company, Rochester/Dover
 D (Duke of Connaught's) Company, Portsmouth
 The London Regiment
 Regimental Headquarters and Headquarters (Anzio) Company, Battersea
 A (London Scottish) Company, Westminster/Catford (including Pipes and Drums)
 B (Queen's Regiment) Company, Edgware/Hornsey (including Corps of Drums)
 C (City of London Fusiliers) Company, Batham (including Corps of Drums)
 D (London Irish Rifles) Company, Camberwell (including Pipes and Drums)
 The Duke of Lancaster's Regiment
 4th (Volunteer) Battalion, The Duke of Lancaster's Regiment
 Battalion Headquarters and Headquarters Company, Preston (including Corps of Drums & Regimental Band)
 A (King's Regiment) Company, Liverpool
 B (Queen's Lancashire Regiment) Company, Blackburn/Blackpool
 C (King's Own Royal Border Regiment) Company, Workington/Carlisle/Barrow-in-Furness
 D (King's Regiment) Company, Manchester/Bury
 The Royal Regiment of Fusiliers
 5th (Volunteer) Battalion, The Royal Regiment of Fusiliers
 Battalion Headquarters and Headquarters Company, Durham (including Corps of Drums & Regimental Band)
 C (Rifles) Company, Washington/Bishop Auckland/Doncaster
 X Company, Newcastle upon Tyne/Tynemouth
 Z Company, Ashington/Alnwick
 The Royal Anglian Regiment
 3rd (Volunteer) Battalion, The Royal Anglian Regiment
 Battalion Headquarters and Headquarters (Suffolk) Company, Bury St Edmunds (including Corps of Drums)
 A (Norfolk and Suffolk) Company, Norwich/Lowestoft
 B (Lincolnshire) Company, Lincoln/Grimsby
 C (Leicestershire and Northamptonshire) Company, Leicester/Northampton
 E (Essex and Hertfordshire) Company, Chelmsford/Hertford
 The Yorkshire Regiment
 4th (Volunteer) Battalion, The Yorkshire Regiment
 Battalion Headquarters and Headquarters Company, York/Scarborough (including Corps of Drums)
 A (Prince of Wales's Own Regiment of Yorkshire) Company, Kingston upon Hull/Beverley/Leeds
 B (Green Howards) Company, Middlesbrough/Northallerton
 C (Duke of Wellington's Regiment) Company, Huddersfield/Keighley
 D (Duke of Wellington's Regiment) Company, Barnsley/Sheffield
 The Mercian Regiment
 4th (Volunteer) Battalion, The Mercian Regiment
 Battalion Headquarters and Headquarters Company, Wolverhampton (including Corps of Drums)
 A (Cheshire) Company, Warrington/Stockport
 B Company, Crewe/Stoke-on-Trent
 C (Worcestershire and Sherwood Foresters) Company, Mansfield
 D (Staffordshire) Company, Wolverhampton/Kidderminster/Burton upon Trent
 F (Fusilier) Company, Birmingham
 L (Light Infantry) Company, Shrewsbury/Herford
 The Royal Welsh
 3rd (Volunteer) Battalion, The Royal Welsh
 Battalion Headquarters and Headquarters Company, Cardiff (including Corps of Drums)
 A (Royal Welch Fusiliers) Company, Wrexham/Queensferry
 B (Royal Regiment of Wales) Company, Swansea/Aberystwyth
 C (Royal Regiment of Wales) Company, Cardiff/Pontypridd
 D (Royal Welch Fusiliers) Company, Colwyn Bay/Caernarfon
 The Royal Irish Regiment
 The Rangers, Royal Irish Regiment
 Battalion Headquarters and Headquarters Company, Portadown/Enniskillen (including Pipes and Drums)
 A Company, Newtownards
 B Company, Newtownabbey/Newtownabbey
 C Company, Armagh/Enniskillen/Ballymena
 The Rifles
 6th (Volunteer) Battalion, The Rifles
 Battalion Headquarters and Headquarters (Devonshire and Dorset) Company, Exeter (including Band and Bugles of 6 RIFLES)
 A (Gloucestershire) Company, Gloucester/Bristol
 B Company, Taunton/Exeter
 C (Devonshire and Dorset) Company, Dorchester/Poole
 D Company, Bodmin/Plymouth
 7th (Volunteer) Battalion, The Rifles
 Battalion Headquarters and Headquarters (Devonshire and Dorset) Company, Reading (including Band and Bugles of 7 RIFLES)
 A Company, Oxford
 E Company, Milton Keynes
 F Company, Davies Street, London
 G Company, West Ham, London
 The Parachute Regiment
 4th (Volunteer) Battalion, The Parachute Regiment
 Battalion Headquarters and Headquarters Company, Pudsey
 10 (London) Company, White City, London/Croydon
 12 (Yorkshire) Company, Pudsey/Hebburn
 13 (Lancashire) Company, Manchester
 15 (Scottish) Company, Glasgow/Edinburgh

Special Air Service
 21 (Artists) Special Air Service (Reserve)
 Regimental Headquarters, London
 A Squadron, Regent's Park Barracks
 B Squadron, Newport
 C Squadron, Bramley
 23 Special Air Service Regiment (Reserve)
 Regimental Headquarters, Birmingham
 A Squadron, Invergowrie/Glasgow
 B Company, Leeds
 C Squadron, Newcastle upon Tyne/Manchester

Army Air Corps
 6th (Volunteer) Regiment, Army Air Corps
 Regimental Headquarters and Support Squadron, Bury St Edmunds
 No. 677 (Suffolk and Norfolk Yeomanry) Squadron, Bury St Edmunds/Swaffham/Norwich
 No. 655 (Scottish Horse) Squadron, Army Aviation Centre

The Royal Logistic Corps
 88th Postal and Courier Regiment, Grantham
 150th (Yorkshire) Transport Regiment
 Regimental Headquarters and 523 Headquarters Squadron, Kingston upon Hull
 217 (Yorkshire) Transport Squadron, Leeds
 218 (East Riding) Transport Squadron, Kingston upon Hull
 219 (West Riding) Transport Squadron, Doncaster
 151st (London) Logistic Support Regiment
 Regimental Headquarters and 508 Headquarters Squadron, Croydon
 124 Petroleum Transport Squadron, Bedford/Ilford
 210 Transport Squadron, Sutton/Maidstone
 240 (Hertfordshire) Tank Transport Squadron, Barnet/Ilford
 562 Transport Squadron, Acton/Southall/Clapham
 152nd (Ulster) Transport Regiment
 Regimental Headquarters and 580 Headquarters Squadron, Belfast
 211 Transport Squadron, Derry/Coleraine
 220 Transport Squadron, Belfast
 400 Transport Squadron, Belfast
 155th (Wessex) Transport Regiment
 Regimental Headquarters and 241 Headquarters Squadron, Plymouth
 232 Transport Squadron, Truro
 233 Transport Squadron, Poole/Doncaster
 245 Transport Squadron, Plymouth
 156th (North West) Transport Regiment
 Regimental Headquarters and 235 Headquarters Squadron, Liverpool
 234 (Wirral) Transport Squadron, Birkenhead
 236 (Greater Manchester) Transport Squadron, Salford
 238 (Sefton) Transport Squadron, Bootle
 The Welsh Transport Regiment
 Regimental Headquarters and 249 Headquarters Squadron, Cardiff
 223 Transport Squadron, Swansea
 224 (Pembroke Yeomanry) Transport Squadron, Carmarthen/Haverfordwest
 580 Transport Squadron, Cardiff
 The Scottish Transport Regiment
 Regimental Headquarters and 527 Headquarters Squadron, Dunfermline
 221 Transport Squadron, Glasgow
 230 Transport Squadron, Edinburgh
 231 Transport Squadron, Glenrothes
 251 Transport Squadron, Irvine
 158th (Royal Anglian) Transport Regiment
 Regimental Headquarters and 200 (Peterborough) Headquarters Squadron, Peterborough
 201 (Bedford) Transport Squadron, Bedford/Peterborough
 202 (Ipswich) Transport Squadron, Ipswich
 203 Transport Squadron, Loughborough/Melton Mowbray
 159th Support Regiment
 Regimental Headquarters, Stoke-on-Trent
 123 Ammunition Squadron, Telford
 126 Rations Squadron, Glasgow
 216 (Tyne Tees) Brigade Support Squadron, Tynemouth
 237 (West Midlands) Brigade Support Squadron, West Bromwich/Stoke-on-Trent
 160th Transport Regiment
 Regimental Headquarters, Grantham
 124 Petroleum Squadron
 261 Transport Squadron
 263 Transport Squadron
 270 Transport Squadron
 162nd Movement Control Regiment
 Regimental Headquarters, Grantham
 280 Movement Control Squadron, Swindon
 281 Operations Squadron
 282 Movement Control Squadron
 283 Movement Control Squadron
 284 Movement Control Squadron
 165th Port and Maritime Regiment
 Regimental Headquarters, Grantham
 102 Port Operations Squadron
 265 Port Squadron
 266 (Princess Beatrice's) Port Support Squadron, Southampton/Isle of Wight
 166th Supply Regiment
 Regimental Headquarters, Grantham
 142 Vehicle Squadron
 294 Supply Squadron
 531 Ammunition Technical Squadron
 710 Operational Hygiene Squadron
 168th Pioneer Regiment
 Regimental Headquarters, Middlesbrough
 100 Pioneer Squadron, Cramlington/Berwick-upon-Tweed/Hexham
 101 Pioneer Squadron, Grantham
 104 Pioneer Squadron, Coulby Newham/Middlesbrough/Hartlepool/Washington
 Catering Support Regiment
 Regimental Headquarters, Grantham
 111 Squadron
 112 Squadron
 113 Squadron
 383 Commando Petroleum Troop, Plymouth
 395 Air Despatch Troop, RAF Brize Norton

Corps of Royal Electrical and Mechanical Engineers 
 101 Force Support Battalion
 Battalion Headquarters and Headquarters Company, Wrexham
 119 Recovery Company, Prestatyn
 126 Field Company, Coventry
 127 Field Company, Manchester
 102 Battalion
 Battalion Headquarters and Headquarters Company, Newton Aycliffe
 124 Recovery Company, Newton Aycliffe
 153 Field Company, Grangemouth
 186 Field Company, Newcastle upon Tyne
 103 Battalion
 Battalion Headquarters and Headquarters Company, Crawley
 128 Field Company, Portsmouth
 133 Field Company, Ashford
 150 Recovery Company, Redhill
 104 Force Support Battalion
 Battalion Headquarters and Headquarters Company, Bordon
 118 Recovery Company, Northampton
 146 Field Company, Rotherham
 147 Field Company, Scunthorpe

Intelligence Corps 
 3rd Military Intelligence Battalion
 Battalion Headquarters, Ashford
 31 Military Intelligence Company, Ashford
 32 Military Intelligence Company, Ashford
 33 Military Intelligence Company, Hampstead
 34 Military Intelligence Company, Hampstead/Cosham
 5th Military Intelligence Battalion
 Battalion Headquarters, Coulby Newham
 52 Military Intelligence Company, Edinburgh
 53 Military Intelligence Company, York
 54 Military Intelligence Company, Bristol
 55 Military Intelligence Company, Stourbridge

Army Medical Services
 Central Reserves Headquarters, Army Medical Services, Strensall Camp
 Army Medical Services Operational Headquarters Support Group, Strensall Camp

Royal Army Medical Corps 
 201 (Northern) Field Hospital
 Regimental Headquarters, Newcastle upon Tyne
 A Squadron, Newton Aycliffe
 B Squadron, Newcastle upon Tyne
 C Squadron, Stockton-on-Tees
 202 (Midlands) Field Hospital
 Regimental Headquarters, Birmingham
 A Squadron, Stoke-on-Trent/Coventry
 B Squadron, Shrewsbury
 C Squadron, Abingdon-on-Thames
 203 (Welsh) Field Hospital
 Regimental Headquarters, Cardiff
 A Squadron, Swansea
 B Squadron, Cwrt y Gollen
 C Squadron, Llandudno
 204 (North Irish) Field Hospital
 Regimental Headquarters, Belfast
 A Squadron, Belfast
 B Squadron, Belfast
 C Squadron, Belfast
 D Squadron, Portadown
 205 (Scottish) Field Hospital
 Regimental Headquarters, Glasgow
 A Squadron, Aberdeen
 D Squadron, Dundee
 E Squadron, Edinburgh
 G Squadron, Glasgow
 I Squadron, Inverness
 207 (Manchester) Field Hospital
 Regimental Headquarters, Manchester
 A Squadron, Stockport
 B Squadron, Bury
 C Squadron, Manchester
 G Squadron, Chorley
 208 (Liverpool) Field Hospital
 Regimental Headquarters, Liverpool
 A Squadron, Liverpool
 B Squadron, Chester
 C Squadron, Blackpool/Lancaster
 212 (Yorkshire) Field Hospital
 Regimental Headquarters, Sheffield
 A Squadron, Leeds/York
 B Squadron, Nottingham/Lincoln
 C Squadron, Kingston upon Hull
 225 (Scottish) Medical Regiment
 Regimental Headquarters and 174 Support Squadron, Dundee
 152 Medical Squadron, Glenrothes
 153 Medical Squadron, Dundee
 251 Medical Squadron, Sunderland
 243 (Wessex) Field Hospital
 Regimental Headquarters, Keynsham
 A Squadron, Keynsham/Gloucester
 B Squadron, Exeter
 C Squadron, Plymouth/Truro
 D Squadron, Portsmouth
 253 (North Irish) Field Ambulance
 Regimental Headquarters and 110 Support Squadron, Sunderland
 107 Medical Squadron, Belfast
 108 Medical Squadron, Limavady/Enniskillen
 109 Medical Squadron, Belfast
 254 (East of England) Medical Regiment
 Regimental Headquarters and 63 Support Squadron, Cambridge
 220 Medical Squadron, Ditton
 256 (City of London) Field Hospital
 Regimental Headquarters, Walworth
 A Squadron, Walworth
 B Squadron, Kensington
 C Squadron, Kingston upon Thames
 D Squadron, Brighton
 306th Hospital Support Regiment, Strensall Camp
 335th Medical Evacuation Regiment, Strensall Camp
 64 Medical Squadron, Chorley/Manchester/Liverpool (under regular 3 Medical Regiment)
 144 Parachute Medical Squadron, Glasgow/Nottingham/Cardiff
 222 Medical Squadron, Leicester/Derby/Birmingham (under regular 2 Medical Regiment)
 250 Medical Squadron, Kingston upon Hull/Grimsby/Castleford (under regular 2 Medical Regiment)

Adjutant General's Corps 
 Central Volunteer Headquarters Adjutant General's Corps
 Army Legal Services
 Educational and Training Support
 Military Provost Staff
 Military Provost Guard Service
 Royal Military Police Special Investigation Branch
 4 Regiment, Royal Military Police
 5 Regiment, Royal Military Police

Army Reserve bands
Army Reserve bands are not part of the Corps of Army Music. They are under the direct command of their parent corps or regiment.

There are currently 20 Army Reserve bands located across the UK with one in Gibraltar:
 Band of the Honourable Artillery Company
 Regimental Band (Inns of Court & City Yeomanry) of the Royal Yeomanry
 Lancashire Artillery Volunteers Band
 The Nottinghamshire Band of the Royal Engineers
 The (Northern) Band of the Royal Corps of Signals
 Lowland Band of the Royal Regiment of Scotland
 Highland Band of the Royal Regiment of Scotland
 Band of the Princess of Wales's Royal Regiment (Queen's and Royal Hampshires)
 Band of the Royal Regiment of Fusiliers
 Band of the Royal Anglian Regiment
 Band of The Royal Irish Regiment (27th (Inniskilling) 83rd and 87th and Ulster Defence Regiment)
 Band of the Royal Welsh
 Band of the Duke of Lancaster's Regiment (King's Lancashire and Border)
 Band of the Yorkshire Regiment (14th/15th, 19th & 33rd/76th Foot)
 The Band of The Mercian Regiment
 The Salamanca Band of The Rifles
 The Waterloo Band of The Rifles
 Band of the 150th (Yorkshire) Transport Regiment, The Royal Logistic Corps
 Band of the Army Medical Services
 Volunteer Band of the Royal Gibraltar Regiment

Pipes and Drums
 Pipes and Drums of the Lancashire Artillery Volunteers
 Pipes and Drums of the 52nd Lowland, 6th Battalion The Royal Regiment of Scotland
 Pipes and Drums of the 51st Highland, 7th Battalion The Royal Regiment of Scotland
 Pipes and Drums of the London Scottish
 Pipes and Drums of the London Irish Rifles
 Pipes and Drums of 152 (Ulster) Transport Regiment (Volunteers) Royal Logistic Corps`
 Pipes and Drums of 102bn REME
 Drums and Pipes of Aberdeen UOTC
 Pipes and Drums of City of Edinburgh UOTC
 Pipes and Drums of Glasgow UOTC
 Pipes and Drums of Tayforth UOTC

Officers' Training Corps

Many British Universities also have Officer Training Corps units, which allow students to experience military life. University Officer Training Corps (UOTCs) still officially form part of the Army Reserve. However, the officer cadets fall into reserve category "B", meaning that they cannot be called up for service unless there is a national emergency.
 Aberdeen UOTC
 Birmingham UOTC
 Bristol UOTC
 Cambridge UOTC
 East Midlands UOTC
 City of Edinburgh UOTC
 Exeter UOTC
 Glasgow and Strathclyde UOTC
 Leeds UOTC
 Liverpool UOTC
 Manchester & Salford UOTC
 Northumbrian UOTC
 Oxford UOTC
 Queen's UOTC
 Sheffield UOTC
 Southampton UOTC
 Tayforth UOTC
 Wales UOTC
 University of London OTC

References

Territorial